Gustav Hellberg (born 1967 in Stockholm), is a Swedish visual artist who lives and works in Berlin.

Life and career
Gustav Hellberg (born 1967, Stockholm) is a Swedish born artist living and working in Berlin. He has created works in Sweden, Germany, Norway and Spain.
Hellberg graduated 1998 from Kungl. Konsthögskolan, Stockholm with a MFA. He has also studied Aesthetics at Stockholm University.
In 2000 he moved to Berlin, where he now lives and works.

Hellberg creates public art, seeking for an interaction between people, artwork and the public space. The intervention he’s seeking is a play upon the memories of an actual place.

To realise a work, he carefully chooses a site depending on its qualities, in order to put out a visual and poetic
argument that will draw people’s attention to a seemingly insignificant situation: the urban backdrop of everyday
life. The basic function of the work that is placed out in a public space is to change a detail in our everyday life
and thereby trigger thoughts in different routes.

Parallel to these activities Hellberg is also exhibiting installations, sculpture and objects in museums and galleries. He has also been a challenging debater on topics surrounding events of art production in the public sphere as well as urban planning in general. Hellberg has lectures at the art colleges Valand Academy and Umeå Academy of Fine Arts. Currently Hellberg is a professor at Chung-Ang University, Republic of South Korea.

Key artworks
 Blinka Malmö stadsbibliotek, Malmö 2002
 Pulsing Path, Madrid 2006
 Solution, Göteborg 2010
 Obstruction, Malmö 2010
 Alien, 2014
 XYZ, 2015, commissioned by Statens Konstråd Public Art Agency Sweden

Important exhibitions
Flaneur, Raid Projects, Los Angeles 2007
Arnstedt & Kullgren, Båstad 2008
Anderson Sandström, Stockholm 2008
Dunkers Kulturhus 2009
Malmö Konstmuseum 2009
Hamish Morrison Galerie, Berlin 2010
EMAF, Osnabrück 2012
Unsere Kunst - Eure Kunst, Stadtgalerie Kiel 2013 
ThingWorld: International Triennial of New Media Art, National Art Museum of China 2014
Dresden Public Art View 2014
Kunst Kraft Werk, Leipzig 2015 
Kunst und Kultur am Rosa-Luxemburg-Platz, Berlin 2015

Further reading
Vision, Gustav Hellberg, Featherweight (KB) 2011, 
Lösning, Volume 70 of Publikation, rollon/Press, 9789163152252
Det slutna öppna konstbegreppet: ett resonemang kring en estetisk modell på väg att förlora sin kraft, Volume 5 of Publikation, rollon/Press, 9789163152221

References

External links
 Official website
 Videos on Vimeo

Swedish male sculptors
German sculptors
German male sculptors
Living people
1967 births